Statistics of League of Ireland in the 1983–1984 season.

Overview
It was contested by 14 teams, and Shamrock Rovers won the championship.

Final table

Cork City and Longford Town were elected to the league for next season.

Results

Top scorers

Ireland, 1983-84
1983–84 in Republic of Ireland association football
League of Ireland seasons